Rija Hujailan Al-Mutairi (born 1941) is a former Kuwaiti politician, representing the fourth district. Al-Mutairi studied management and worked in the Ministry of Education before being elected to the National Assembly in 2008.

Supported guaranteeing bank deposits
On October 28, 2008, the parliament voted 50–7 to insure all types of deposits in all local banks within Kuwait. Al-Mutairi supported the bill, arguing that its passage would assuage people's fear of losing their deposits and rebuild their trust in Kuwait's economy during the financial crisis of 2007–2008.

References

Kuwaiti people of Arab descent
Members of the National Assembly (Kuwait)
Living people
1941 births